In probability theory and statistics, a central moment is a moment of a probability distribution of a random variable about the random variable's mean; that is, it is the expected value of a specified integer power of the deviation of the random variable from the mean. The various moments form one set of values by which the properties of a probability distribution can be usefully characterized. Central moments are used in preference to ordinary moments, computed in terms of deviations from the mean instead of from zero, because the higher-order central moments relate only to the spread and shape of the distribution, rather than also to its location.

Sets of central moments can be defined for both univariate and multivariate distributions.

Univariate moments

The nth moment about the mean (or nth central moment) of a real-valued random variable X is the quantity μn := E[(X − E[X])n], where E is the expectation operator. For a continuous univariate probability distribution with probability density function f(x), the nth moment about the mean μ is

For random variables that have no mean, such as the Cauchy distribution, central moments are not defined.

The first few central moments have intuitive interpretations:
 The "zeroth" central moment μ0 is 1.
 The first central moment μ1 is 0 (not to be confused with the first raw moment or the expected value μ).
 The second central moment μ2 is called the variance, and is usually denoted σ2, where σ represents the standard deviation.
 The third and fourth central moments are used to define the standardized moments which are used to define skewness and kurtosis, respectively.

Properties
The nth central moment is translation-invariant, i.e. for any random variable X and any constant c, we have

For all n, the nth central moment is homogeneous of degree n:

Only for n such that n equals 1, 2, or 3 do we have an additivity property for random variables X and Y that are independent:

 provided n ∈ }.

A related functional that shares the translation-invariance and homogeneity properties with the nth central moment, but continues to have this additivity property even when n ≥ 4 is the nth cumulant κn(X).  For n = 1, the nth cumulant is just the expected value; for n = either 2 or 3, the nth cumulant is just the nth central moment; for n ≥ 4, the nth cumulant is an nth-degree monic polynomial in the first n moments (about zero), and is also a (simpler) nth-degree polynomial in the first n central moments.

Relation to moments about the origin
Sometimes it is convenient to convert moments about the origin to moments about the mean. The general equation for converting the nth-order moment about the origin to the moment about the mean is

where μ is the mean of the distribution, and the moment about the origin is given by

For the cases n = 2, 3, 4 — which are of most interest because of the relations to variance, skewness, and kurtosis, respectively — this formula becomes (noting that  and ):

 which is commonly referred to as 

... and so on, following Pascal's triangle, i.e.

because 

The following sum is a stochastic variable having a compound distribution

Symmetric distributions

In distributions that are symmetric about their means (unaffected by being reflected about the mean), all odd central moments equal zero whenever they exist, because in the formula for the nth moment, each term involving a value of X less than the mean by a certain amount exactly cancels out the term involving a value of X greater than the mean by the same amount.

Multivariate moments

For a continuous bivariate probability distribution with probability density function f(x,y) the (j,k) moment about the mean μ = (μX, μY) is

Central moment of complex random variables
The nth central moment for a complex random variable X is defined as 

The absolute nth central moment of X is defined as

The 2nd-order central moment β2 is called the variance of X whereas the 2nd-order central moment α2 is the pseudo-variance of X.

See also
Standardized moment
Image moment

Complex random variable

References

Statistical deviation and dispersion
Moment (mathematics)

fr:Moment (mathématiques)#Moment centré